Tythothyris is a monotypic genus of brachiopods belonging to the family Terebrataliidae. The only species is Tythothyris rosimarginata.

The species is found in Kuril Islands.

References

Brachiopod genera